Pedro de Añazco was a Peruvian creole Jesuit missionary.

Biography
He was born at Chachapoyas (Peru) in 1550; died at Asunción (Paraguay) in 1605. His father Pedro de Añazco was a Spanish captain, companion of Sebastián de Belalcázar in the conquest of Ecuador; and through him, it is said, the first notice of the "Dorado" of Guatavitá reached the Spaniards in Ecuador.
 
At the age of twenty-two, Añazco became a Jesuit. In 1577, he was sent to Julí, on Lake Titicaca. Thence he passed to the Chaco tribe among the Abipón people and in 1593 to Paraguay, where he would die.
 
He was an indefatigable missionary and a zealous student of Indian languages. Highly respectable authorities like Gonzalez Dávila and Lozano credit him with having composed grammars, "doctrines" and catechisms in nine different Indian languages of South America.
 
Dávila, teatro eclesiastico de la primitiva Iglesia de las Indias occidentales (Madrid, 1649); Lozano, Descripcion del gran Chaco (Cordova, 1733); Mendiburu, Diccionario; Torres Saldamando, Antiguos Jesuitas (Lima, 1882); Relaciones geograficas de Indias (Madrid, 1897), Appendix IV, None of Añazco's linguistic works have been published, and it is to be feared that most, if not all, his manuscripts are lost.

Sources

1550 births
1605 deaths
People from Chachapoyas Province
Peruvian people of Spanish descent
Peruvian Roman Catholic missionaries
Roman Catholic missionaries in Paraguay
16th-century Peruvian Jesuits
Jesuit missionaries in Peru
Jesuit missionaries in Ecuador
Jesuit missionaries in Bolivia
Jesuit missionaries in Paraguay